The 2019 Southland Conference baseball tournament was held from May 23 through 25.  The top eight regular season finishers of the league's thirteen teams met in the double-elimination tournament held at Constellation Field in Sugar Land, Texas.  The winner of the tournament, McNeese State, earned the conference's automatic bid to the 2019 NCAA Division I baseball tournament.

Seeding and format
The top eight finishers from the regular season were seeded one through eight.  They played a two bracket, double-elimination tournament, with the winner of each bracket meeting in a single championship final.

Results

Conference championship

References

Tournament
Southland Conference Baseball Tournament
Southland Conference baseball tournament
Southland Conference baseball tournament